The Holmes Street Bridge, also known the Holmes Street Pedestrian Bridge, Old Shakopee Bridge, or Bridge 4175, is a historic truss bridge over the Minnesota River in Shakopee, Minnesota, United States.  It is one of the state's only examples of a deck truss bridge.  It was constructed in 1927 with parts manufactured by the Minneapolis Steel & Machinery Company.  The bridge formerly carried US 169 and MN 101, and served as the principal river crossing for Shakopee.  The Holmes Street Bridge was closed to vehicular traffic in 2005.  It was rehabilitated in 2011 to carry a trail for pedestrians, cross-country skiers, and snowmobiles.

Description
The bridge has four spans over the river and two approach spans over land on either end. The load-bearing structure consists of three parallel Warren trusses, an unusual configuration as two parallel trusses were the norm. Neoclassical elements appear on the bridge piers, abutments, and parapet railings.

History
The bridge was built to carry Minnesota State Highway 5, locally known within Shakopee as Holmes Street.  The route was later redesignated U.S. Route 169/State Highway 101.  In 2009 a new bridge was built a block to the east to carry the highways.

A study from 1985 had identified only 10 deck truss bridges built in Minnesota before 1946.  The Holmes Street Bridge is the only road bridge of that number still standing.

The bridge was listed on the National Register of Historic Places in 2010 for its state-level significance in the theme of engineering.  It was nominated for its rare design type and its fabrication by an important Minnesota bridge manufacturer.

See also
 
 
 
 
 List of crossings of the Minnesota River
 List of bridges on the National Register of Historic Places in Minnesota
 National Register of Historic Places listings in Scott County, Minnesota

References

External links

 Holmes Street Bridge (Bridge 4175)

1927 establishments in Minnesota
Bridges completed in 1927
Buildings and structures in Scott County, Minnesota
Former road bridges in Minnesota
Metal bridges in the United States
National Register of Historic Places in Scott County, Minnesota
Pedestrian bridges in Minnesota
Road bridges on the National Register of Historic Places in Minnesota
Transportation in Scott County, Minnesota
U.S. Route 169
Warren truss bridges in the United States